The 1987 LPGA Tour was the 38th season since the LPGA Tour officially began in 1950. The season ran from January 29 to November 8. The season consisted of 33 official money events. Jane Geddes won the most tournaments, five. Ayako Okamoto led the money list with earnings of $466,034.

There were seven first-time winners in 1987: Laura Davies, Rosie Jones, Yuko Moriguchi, Cindy Rarick, Deb Richard, Jody Rosenthal, and Colleen Walker.

The tournament results and award winners are listed below.

Tournament results
The following table shows all the official money events for the 1987 season. "Date" is the ending date of the tournament. The numbers in parentheses after the winners' names are the number of wins they had on the tour up to and including that event. Majors are shown in bold.

* - non-member at time of win

Awards

References

External links
LPGA Tour official site
1987 season coverage at golfobserver.com

LPGA Tour seasons
LPGA Tour